Hulk: Where Monsters Dwell is a 2016 American direct-to-video animated superhero film featuring the superhero character Hulk. The movie takes its name from a 1970s Marvel comic book title. Just like Marvel Super Hero Adventures: Frost Fight!, this film is set within the same continuity as Avengers Assemble and second film in the Marvel Animated Universe.

Plot

Doctor Strange brings Hulk to New York City to assist fighting rampaging monsters on Halloween night, which were young teens stuck dreaming and changed into the monsters that they fear. During battle, Hulk randomly reverts to an unconscious Bruce Banner. Doctor Strange planned a trip to the Dream Dimension with the Hulk to get to the bottom of the monsters while confronting Nightmare. Before this happens, they call upon the Howling Commandos (consisting of Jasper Sitwell's zombie form, Man-Thing, Vampire by Night / Nina Price, Warwolf, and Minotaur / Benito Serrano) to watch over their physical forms and contain the rampaging monsters. Banner and Hulk split for their trip to other dimension with Banner using the dream version of Iron Man's Hulkbuster armor.

Voice cast
 Jesse Burch as Bruce Banner, Waiter
 Fred Tatasciore as Hulk, Countdown
 Liam O'Brien as Stephen Strange / Doctor Strange
 Matthew Waterson as Nightmare
 Edward Bosco as Vince Marcus / Warwolf, Minotaur, Reveler
 Jon Olson as Dr. Theodore "Ted" Sallis / Man-Thing, Rorgg, Sporr, Zzutak
 Michael Robles as Benito Serrano
 Mike Vaughn as Jasper Sitwell's Undead Form 
 Zach Callison as Eric, Kid Dressed as Ninja
 Hope Levy as Gayle, Kid Dressed as Pirate, Kid Dressed as Princess
 Laura Bailey as Ana, Kid Dressed as Vampire, Kid Dressed as Football Player
 Chiara Zanni as Nina Price / Vampire by Night, Bee Girl, Nurse

Crew
 Jamie Simone - Casting and Voice Director

Development
It was first announced at the San Diego Comic-Con 2016, where it had its world premiere. The film was released on Digital HD on October 21, 2016.

Reception
Screen Rant awarded the film a positive review, saying "All in all, Hulk: Where Monsters Dwell isn't nearly as thoughtful a story as it could have been, but for a superhero adventure that's loosely tied to a holiday, it works. Kids will enjoy themselves, while adults may struggle to make it through the whole film." Newsarama was more critical in their review, aiming specific criticisms at the dialogue and pacing, ultimately saying "There's definitely a solid 45-minute episode of Avengers Assemble in this that could have easily worked better." ScienceFiction.com awarded it 3.5 out of five, saying "the movie is a solid Halloween cartoon overall".

References

External links

2010s American animated films
2010s direct-to-video animated superhero films
2010s monster movies
2016 animated films
2016 films
2016 direct-to-video films
Animated films based on Marvel Comics
Animated films set in New York City
Hulk (comics) films
Demons in film
Direct-to-video animated films
American films about Halloween
2010s English-language films